The Miami Open (also known as the Miami Masters, and currently branded as the Miami Open presented by Itaú for sponsorship reasons) is a tennis tournament held at Hard Rock Stadium in Miami Gardens, Florida. It is part of the men's ATP Tour Masters 1000 circuit, and part of the women's WTA 1000 circuit. The Miami Open is usually held between March and April.

The tournament had historically been held at the Tennis Center at Crandon Park in Key Biscayne, Florida from 1987 through 2018, before moving to Miami Gardens for 2019. Behind the Indian Wells Masters, it is the second event of the "Sunshine Double"—a series of two consecutive hard court tournaments in the United States at the beginning of the season. They are the only tournaments besides majors where main draw play extends beyond eight days.

In 2010, a record 300,000 visitors attended matches at the 12-day tournament, making it one of the largest tennis tournaments outside the four Grand Slams. In 2011, 316,267 visitors attended Miami.

History

The initial idea of holding an international tennis tournament in Miami was born in the 1960s, when famous tennis players such as Pancho Gonzalez, Jack Kramer, Pancho Segura, Frank Sedgman, and Butch Buchholz toured across the country in a station wagon, playing tennis in fairgrounds with portable canvas court. The tournament officially was founded by former player Butch Buchholz who was executive director of the Association of Tennis Professionals (ATP) in the 1980s. His original aim was to make the event the first major tournament of the year (the Australian Open was held in December at that time), and he dubbed it the "Winter Wimbledon". Buchholz approached the ATP and the WTA, offering to provide the prize-money and to give them a percentage of the ticket sales and worldwide television rights in return for the right to run the tournament for 15 years. The two associations agreed.

The first tournament was held in February 1985 at Laver's International Tennis Resort in Delray Beach, Florida. Buchholz brought in Alan Mills, the tournament referee at Wimbledon, as the head referee, and Ted Tinling, a well-known tennis fashion designer since the 1920s, as the director of protocol. At the time, the prize money of US$1.8 million was surpassed only by Wimbledon and the US Open. The event's prize money has since grown to over $13 million.

In 1986, the tournament was played at Boca West. After its successful year there, Merrett Stierheim, Dade County manager and Women's Tennis Association (WTA) president, helped Buchholz move the tournament to its long-term home in Key Biscayne from 1987. In keeping with ambitions of its founder, the tournament has been maintained as one of the premier events in pro tennis after the Grand Slams and the ATP World Tour Finals sometimes referred to as the "Fifth Major" up until the mid-2000s. In 1999, Buchholz sold the tournament to IMG.  In 2004, the Indian Wells Masters also expanded to a multi-week 96 player field, and since then, the two events have been colloquially termed the "Sunshine Double".

The aging Crandon Park facility had been criticized as the slowest hard court on the tour, subjecting players to endless grinding rallies in extreme heat and humidity. The land on which the Crandon Park facility stands had been donated to Miami-Dade County by the Matheson family in 1992 under a stipulation that only one stadium could be built on it. The tournament organizers proposed a $50 million upgrade of Crandon Park that would have added several permanent stadiums, and the family responded with a lawsuit. In 2015, an appeals court ruled in the family's favor, preventing upgrades from being made to the aging complex. The organizers decided not to pursue further legal action and started looking for a new site. In November 2017, the Miami Open signed an agreement with Miami-Dade County to move the annual tournament from the tennis complex in Key Biscayne to Hard Rock Stadium in Miami Gardens, Florida beginning in 2019.

The stadium is primarily used for American football; a modified seating layout with temporary grandstands is used as center court. While it has the same number of seats as the center court at Crandon Park, it also has access to the stadium's luxury seating and suites. New permanent courts were also built on the site's parking lots, including a new grandstand court.

The 2020 Miami Open was postponed to 2021 due to the COVID-19 pandemic; the tournament was held with limited attendance, and Hard Rock Stadium proper was therefore not used.

The tournament has had multiple sponsorships in its history. During its inaugural playing in 1985, the tournament was known as the Lipton International Players Championships and it was a premier event of the Grand Prix Tennis Tour. In 2000, the event was renamed the Ericsson Open and in 2002, the event became known as the NASDAQ-100 Open. In 2007, the tournament was renamed the Sony Ericsson Open. Since 2015, the international bank Itaú has been the presenting sponsor.

Event characteristics
Beside the four Major championships, the Miami Open is one of a small number of events on the ATP and WTA tours where the main singles draw (for both the men and the women) involves more than 64 players, and where main draw play extends beyond one week. 96 men and 96 women compete in the singles competition, and 32 teams compete in each of the doubles competitions with the event lasting 12 days.

In 2006, the tournament became the first event in the United States to use Hawk-Eye to allow players to challenge close line calls. Players were allowed three challenges per set, with an additional challenge allowed for tiebreaks. The first challenge was made by Jamea Jackson against Ashley Harkleroad in the first round.

From 1985 until 1990 and again from 1997 to 2007, the men's final was held as a best-of-five set match, similar to the Grand Slam events. After 2007 the ATP required that the handful of ATP World Tour Masters 1000 events which had best-of-five finals switch to the usual ATP best-of-three match format because several times the participants in long finals matches ended up withdrawing from tennis tournaments they were scheduled to participate in which were commencing in only two or three days. The last best-of-five set final was won by Novak Djokovic in 2007.

Tournament name
1985–1992; Lipton International Players Championship

1993–1999; Lipton Championship 

2000–2001; Ericsson Open 

2002–2006; NASDAQ-100 Open 

2007–2012; Sony Ericsson Open 

2013–2014; Sony Open Tennis 

2015–present; Miami Open presented by Itaú

Points and prize money
As an ATP Tour Masters 1000 event, the tournament is worth up to 1000 ATP rankings points to the singles and doubles champions. On both the ATP and the WTA, this is the third highest level of event. This is a table detailing the points and prize money allocation for each round of the 2016 Miami ATP Masters 1000 and WTA Premier Mandatory event:

Point distribution

 Players with byes receive first round points.

Prize money

Past finals

Men's singles

 The men's final has been abandoned three times since the tournament's inception:

Women's singles

Men's doubles

Women's doubles

Mixed doubles

Records

Sunshine Double 
The Sunshine Double is a feat in tennis achieved when a player wins the titles of the Indian Wells Open and the Miami Open back-to-back.

To date, 11 players have achieved this in singles, and 22 in doubles.

Singles players

Doubles players

References

External links

 Official tournament website
 ATP tournament profile
 Satellite view of the tournament venue (Google Maps)
 Miami Masters Tennis news & live streams 

 
Hard court tennis tournaments in the United States
WTA Tour
Sports competitions in Miami
Recurring sporting events established in 1985
ATP Tour Masters 1000
Tennis tournaments in Florida
1985 establishments in Florida
Annual sporting events in the United States